The 1983 Ohio Bobcats football team was an American football team that represented Ohio University in the Mid-American Conference (MAC) during the 1983 NCAA Division I-A football season. In their fifth season under head coach Brian Burke, the Bobcats compiled a 4–7 record (3–6 against MAC opponents), finished in eighth place, and were outscored by all opponents by a combined total of 270 to 163.  They played their home games in Peden Stadium in Athens, Ohio.

Schedule

References

Ohio
Ohio Bobcats football seasons
Ohio Bobcats football